"Plug In Baby" is a song by English rock band Muse. It was released as the lead single from the band's second studio album, Origin of Symmetry (2001), on 12 March 2001.

The song became the band's highest-charting single in the UK when it peaked at number 11 on the UK Singles Chart, until it was surpassed by "Time Is Running Out", which peaked at number 8 in 2003. Today, "Plug In Baby" is considered one of Muse's most notable songs, and has been featured on the live albums Hullabaloo Soundtrack (2002), HAARP (2008) and Live at Rome Olympic Stadium (2013).

Background and composition
"Plug In Baby" is written in the key of B minor (although the song does not begin or end on the tonic chord of the key). It's mainly guitar and bass-driven, and moves at a tempo of 136 bpm. The guitar riff is based on the harmonic minor scale.

The beginning of the riff shows similarities to the toccata from Bach's "Toccata and Fugue in D minor, BWV 565" and the beginning of Samuel Barber's "Adagio for Strings".

One of the B-sides to the single, "Execution Commentary", was described by Bellamy as the "worst song I've ever written".

Recording
The 1997 studio demo of the song lacked the main riff of the song, although there were numerous similarities in the lyrics and structure. "Plug In Baby" was to be re-recorded under the wishes of Maverick to coincide with the US tour promoting the Origin of Symmetry album. As Maverick wished Bellamy to tone down the falsetto on the song as well as on the album, Muse left the label and Origin of Symmetry remained unreleased in the US until 2005.

Legacy 
The song is often praised for its opening guitar riff, which Total Guitar magazine readers voted as the number 1 ultimate guitar riff of the 2000s and the 13th best of all-time in 2004. In 2011, Spinner.com named "Plug In Baby" the 46th greatest guitar riff of all time, citing its "play on Bach's 'Toccata and Fugue in D minor, BWV 565'." The song has been featured on the video games Guitar Hero 5 and Rocksmith.

Track listing

Personnel

Muse
 Matthew Bellamy – lead vocals, guitar, keyboard, production, mixing
 Christopher Wolstenholme – bass, backing vocals, production, mixing
 Dominic Howard – drums, production, mixing

Additional personnel
 David Bottrill – production, engineering
 John Cornfield – mixing
 Tanya Andrew – artwork

Charts

Certifications

Release history

References

External links
 

Muse (band) songs
2001 singles
2001 songs
Mushroom Records singles
Music videos directed by Howard Greenhalgh
Popular songs based on classical music
Song recordings produced by David Bottrill
Songs written by Matt Bellamy
UK Independent Singles Chart number-one singles